Toy Story 4 (Original Motion Picture Soundtrack) is the soundtrack album for the 2019 film Toy Story 4, the fourth instalment in the Toy Story franchise, created by Pixar Animation Studios and released by Walt Disney Pictures. Randy Newman, who composed for the previous instalments returned to score the film. The soundtrack featured Newman's score along with three original songs, which released on June 21, 2019, with the film. In addition to the English-language, the soundtrack album was released in Spanish (Castilian), Spanish (Neutral), Italian, Portuguese, Vietnamese, Mandarin, Korean, Japanese, Russian and Polish languages.

Development 
Randy Newman confirmed his involvement in Toy Story 4 during the 2015 D23 Expo. Director Josh Cooley said that he hired him to return because he "can't imagine making a fourth [film] without Randy Newman." Stating his inclusion, Cooley in an interview to Variety magazine, said that "There were three people that I wanted to make sure were feeling the story: Tom [Hanks], Tim [Allen] and Randy. It took a while to get this story right, but once we were feeling right about it, we went to Randy’s house and pitched him. It was so important for me to have his approval." About the film's music, Newman had said:This one was easier in a way. It’s hard keeping the emotional level sustained for as long as this one required. But in some ways it was easier, because I could use bits and pieces of music that I had from before [during 1995].Recording of the film's score began with three sessions being conducted on September 2018, January and June 2019, in a span of around eight to ten months. Newman wrote new themes for Bonnie, Gabby Gabby, and Duke Caboom, with the latter's featuring accordions and mandolins to represent the character's memories of rejection. He also wrote a "subordinate theme" for Forky. Newman also reused his previous orchestral themes from the first three films. He wrote two new songs for the film, titled "The Ballad of the Lonesome Cowboy" and "I Can't Let You Throw Yourself Away", with Newman also performing the latter. The Los Angeles Orchestra performed the orchestral music during the third session.

On June 5, 2019, Chris Stapleton's version of "Cowboy" was released as a single. The film's soundtrack, featuring Newman's score, Stapleton's and Newman's versions of the two new songs, and Newman's "You've Got a Friend in Me", was released on June 21, 2019, coinciding with the film's theatrical release.

Track listing

Charts

Accolades

References 

2019 soundtrack albums
Pixar soundtracks
Walt Disney Records soundtracks
Randy Newman soundtracks
Toy Story
Film scores
Animated film soundtracks
Comedy-drama film soundtracks